Joy Laurey is the pen name of a French writer, Jean-Pierre Imbrohoris (6 August 1943 - 13 December 1993), author of the series of erotic novels Joy.

The novels were adapted many times for the cinema, with actresses such as Claudia Udy, Brigitte Lahaie or Zara Whites.

In December 1993, Imbrohoris died in a car accident in southern France which also killed his wife, his son and novelist Vanessa Duriès.

Bibliography

As Joy Laurey
Joy (1981)
Joy and Joan (1982)
Joy in Love  
Jessica (1997)
The return of Joy

As Jean-Pierre Imbrohoris
Marion du Faouët
Toute la vérité

References

External links
 

1943 births
1993 deaths
French erotica writers
French male writers
20th-century French male writers
20th-century pseudonymous writers